The Fischer's pygmy fruit bat or Philippine pygmy fruit bat (Haplonycteris fischeri) is a species of megabat in the family Pteropodidae. It is monotypic within the genus Haplonycteris. It is endemic to the Philippines. Its natural habitat is subtropical or tropical dry forests.

References

Mammals of the Philippines
Megabats
Endemic fauna of the Philippines

Mammals described in 1939
Taxonomy articles created by Polbot
Bats of Southeast Asia